Rawdon may refer to:

Places
in England
 Rawdon, West Yorkshire
 Rawdon Colliery, Leicestershire
in Canada
 Rawdon, Quebec
 Rawdon, Ontario, a historic township merged since 1997 into the municipality of Stirling-Rawdon, Ontario
 Rawdon Township, Nova Scotia, a historic township merged since 1861 into the Municipal District of East Hants

People
 The Rawdon Baronets of Moira, County Down, also Baron Rawdon and Earl Rawdon or Earl of Rawdon,  as titles in the lineage of the Marquess of Hastings
 Francis Rawdon-Hastings, 1st Marquess of Hastings
 John Rawdon, 1st Earl of Moira
 James Rawdon Stansfeld (1866–1936), British army officer

Fictional characters
 Col. Rawdon Crawley and his son and namesake Sir Rawdon Crawley, characters in the 1848 novel Vanity Fair by William Makepeace Thackeray